David Leon Holmes (January 7, 1924 – August 25, 1999) was an American football player, coach, and college athletics administrator.  He was the head coach football coach at Eastern Washington State College—now known as Eastern Washington University—from 1963 to 1967, where his record was 34–13–1.  Holmes then went on to the University of Hawaii (1968–1973), where he still holds the record for highest career winning percentage (.718).  Under Holmes, Hawaii never had a losing season.  Holmes was a graduate of Tonasket High School and Whitworth College in Spokane, Washington.  Holmes began and ended his head coaching career as a high school coach in Spokane.  Prior to his tenure at Eastern Washington, he was the head coach at North Central High School, where he compiled a 35–28–4 record.  Holmes finished his coaching career at University High School. His record at University was 60–38–3 from 1974 to 1984. His career prep record was 95–66–7.  Holmes died on August 25, 1999 at the age of 75 of an apparent heart attack while fly fishing in Northern Idaho.

Head coaching record

College

References

External links
 

1924 births
1999 deaths
American football guards
Eastern Washington Eagles athletic directors
Eastern Washington Eagles football coaches
Hawaii Rainbow Warriors football coaches
Whitworth Pirates football players
High school football coaches in Washington (state)
People from Wenatchee, Washington